Tin Star may refer to:

A slang term for a sheriff in the United States
Tin Star (video game), a 1994 light gun shooting game for Super NES
Tin Star (band), a British techno band
The Tin Star, a 1957 film
Tin Star (TV series), a British-Canadian television series
Tin Star, a 2013 album by Lindi Ortega